Cheikh Sidy Ba (born 31 March 1968) is a Senegalese former footballer who played as a defender.

References

1968 births
Living people
Senegalese footballers
Footballers from Dakar
Association football defenders
LASK players
Senegalese expatriate footballers
Expatriate footballers in Austria
Senegalese expatriate sportspeople in Austria
2000 African Cup of Nations players
Senegal international footballers